Kenneth Macrae MacLeod (born 2 August 1954 in Steòrnabhagh) is a Scottish science fiction writer. His novels The Sky Road and The Night Sessions won the BSFA Award. MacLeod's novels have been nominated for the Arthur C. Clarke, Hugo, Nebula, Locus, and Campbell Memorial awards for best novel on multiple occasions. A techno-utopianist, MacLeod's work makes frequent use of libertarian socialist themes; he is a three-time winner of the libertarian Prometheus Award. Prior to becoming a novelist, MacLeod studied biology and worked as a computer programmer. He sits on the advisory board of the Edinburgh Science Festival.

Biography
MacLeod was born in Stornoway, Scotland on 2 August 1954. He graduated from Glasgow University with a degree in zoology and has worked as a computer programmer and written a masters thesis on biomechanics. He was a Trotskyist activist in the 1970s and early 1980s and is married and has two children.  He lived in South Queensferry near Edinburgh before moving to Gourock, on the Firth of Clyde, in June 2017.

MacLeod is opposed to Scottish independence.

Writing
He is part of a group of British science fiction writers who specialise in hard science fiction and space opera. His contemporaries include Neal Asher, Stephen Baxter, Iain M. Banks, Paul J. McAuley, Alastair Reynolds, Adam Roberts, Charles Stross, Richard Morgan, and Liz Williams.

His science fiction novels often explore socialist, communist, and anarchist political ideas, especially Trotskyism and anarcho-capitalism (or extreme economic libertarianism). Technical themes encompass singularities, divergent human cultural evolution, and post-human cyborg-resurrection. MacLeod's general outlook can be best described as techno-utopian socialist, though unlike a majority of techno-utopians, he has expressed great scepticism over the possibility and especially over the desirability of strong AI.

He is known for his constant in-joking and punning on the intersection between socialist ideologies and computer programming, as well as other fields. For example, his chapter titles such as "Trusted Third Parties" or "Revolutionary Platform" usually have double (or multiple) meanings. A future programmers union is called "Information Workers of the World Wide Web", or the Webblies, a reference to the Industrial Workers of the World, who are nicknamed the Wobblies. The Webblies idea formed a central part of the novel For the Win by Cory Doctorow and MacLeod is acknowledged as coining the term. Doctorow and Charles Stross also used one of MacLeod's references to the singularity as "the rapture for nerds" as the title for their collaborative novel Rapture of the Nerds (although MacLeod denies coining the phrase). There are also many references to, or puns on, zoology and palaeontology. For example, in The Stone Canal  the title of the book, and many places described in it, are named after anatomical features of marine invertebrates such as starfish.

Books about MacLeod
The Science Fiction Foundation have published an analysis of MacLeod's work titled The True Knowledge Of Ken MacLeod  (2003), edited by Andrew M. Butler and Farah Mendlesohn. As well as critical essays it contains material by MacLeod himself, including his introduction to the German edition of Banks' Consider Phlebas.

Bibliography

Series
 Fall Revolution series
 The Star Fraction (1995; US paperback ) – Prometheus Award winner, 1996; Clarke Award nominee, 1996
 The Stone Canal (1996; US paperback ) – Prometheus Award winner, 1998; BSFA nominee, 1996
 The Cassini Division (1998; US paperback ) – BSFA nominee, 1998; Clarke, and Nebula Awards nominee, 1999
 The Sky Road (1999; US paperback ) BSFA Award winner, 1999; Hugo Award nominee, 2001 – represents an 'alternate future' to the second two books, as its events diverge sharply due to a choice made differently by one of the protagonists in the middle of The Stone Canal
 This series is also available in two volumes:
 Fractions: The First Half of the Fall Revolution (2009; US paperback )
 Divisions: The Second Half of the Fall Revolution (2009; US paperback )
 Engines of Light Trilogy
 Cosmonaut Keep (2000; US paperback ) – Clarke Award nominee, 2001; Hugo Award nominee, 2002 Begins the series with a first contact story in a speculative mid-21st century where a resurgently socialist USSR (incorporating the European Union) is once again in opposition with the capitalist United States, then diverges into a story told on the other side of the galaxy of Earth-descended colonists trying to establish trade and relations within an interstellar empire of several species who travel from world to world at the speed of light.
 Dark Light (2001; US paperback ) – Campbell Award nominee, 2002
 Engine City (2002; US paperback )
 The Corporation Wars
 Dissidence (2016)
 Insurgence (2016)
 Emergence (2017)
 Lightspeed
 Beyond the Hallowed Sky (2021)

Other work
 Newton's Wake: A Space Opera (2004; US paperback edition ) – BSFA nominee, 2004; Campbell Award nominee, 2005
 Learning the World: A Novel of First Contact (2005; UK hardback edition ) Prometheus Award winner 2006; Hugo, Locus SF, Campbell and Clarke Awards nominee, 2006; BSFA nominee, 2005
 "The Highway Men" (2006; UK edition )
 The Execution Channel (2007; UK hardback edition ) – BSFA Award nominee, 2007; Campbell, and Clarke Awards nominee, 2008
 The Night Sessions (2008; UK hardback edition ) – Winner Best Novel 2008 BSFA
 The Restoration Game (2010). According to the author, "In The Restoration Game I revisited the fall of the Soviet Union, with a narrator who is at first a piece in a game played by others, and works her way up to becoming to some extent a player, but – as we see when we pull back at the end – is still part of a larger game."
 Intrusion (2012): "an Orwellian surveillance society installs sensors on pregnant women to prevent smoking or drinking; and these women also have to take a eugenic 'fix' to eliminate genetic anomalies.
 Descent (2014):  "My genre model for Descent was bloke-lit – that's basically first-person, self-serving, rueful confessional by a youngish man looking back on youthful stupidities... ... Descent is about flying saucers, hidden races, and Antonio Gramsci's concept of passive revolution, all set in a tale of Scottish middle class family life in and after the Great Depression of the 21st Century. Almost mainstream fiction, really."

Short fiction
 "The Web: Cydonia" (1998; UK paperback edition ; part of the young adult fiction series The Web. Collected in Giant Lizards from Another Star)
 "The Light Company" (1998)
 "The Human Front" (2002; winner of Short-form Sidewise Award for Alternate History 2002; collected in Giant Lizards from Another Star)
 "The Highway Men" (2006)
 "Who's Afraid of Wolf 359?" (The New Space Opera, 2007; nominated for Hugo Award for Best Short Story)
 "Ms Found on a Hard Drive" (Glorifying Terrorism, 2007)
 "Earth Hour" (2011)
 "The Entire Immense Superstructure': An Installation" (Reach for Infinity, 2014)

Collections
 Poems & Polemics (2001; Rune Press: Minneapolis, MN) Chapbook of non-fiction and poetry.
 Giant Lizards From Another Star (2006; US trade hardcover ) Collected fiction and nonfiction.

References

External links

 Ken MacLeod's Weblog
 Ken MacLeod's page at Macmillan.com
 
 The Human Genre Project, a collection of works on genetic themes, collated and maintained by MacLeod
 Free MacLeod stories online at Free Speculative Fiction Online

Interviews
 Interview with Ken Macleod at SFFWorld.com
 SF Zone interview with MacLeod
 Interview on the SciFiDimensions Podcast
 Science Saturday: Galactic Princesses Edition Bloggingheads dialog with Annalee Newitz

 The story behind Descent - Online Essay by Ken MacLeod

1954 births
Alumni of the University of Glasgow
Left-libertarians
Living people
British alternative history writers
People from Stornoway
Scottish bloggers
Scottish science fiction writers
Scottish socialists
Sidewise Award winners
Scottish Trotskyists
Scottish libertarians
British transhumanists
Scottish male novelists